Racha Thewa is a commune (tambon) in Bang Phli District, Samut Prakan province, Thailand. It is the site of Suvarnabhumi Airport. The name of the district originates from Saming Racha, a well-known family in the area.

Administration
The tambon is administered by a tambon administrative organization (TAO). It is divided into 15 villages (mubans).

References

External links
thaitambon.com

Tambon of Samut Prakan Province